Sainte-Flaive-des-Loups is a commune in the Vendée department in the Pays de la Loire region in western France.

See also
Communes of the Vendée department

References

Communes of Vendée